Neishi is a railway station on the Taiwan Railways Administration South-link line in Fangshan Township, Pingtung County, Taiwan.

In order to get to the platform from the train station, commuters would have to cross the railway track and the station is staffless. The train station sees only 4 trains calling here and many more trains passing by. In conjunction with the electrification works on the South-link Line, a side platform is being constructed which allows commuters to get the platform without crossing the railway track.

History
The station was opened on 5 October 1992.

Trivia
Neishi is the least used TRA station, according to The TRA Volume of Passenger & Freight Traffic report in 2015, only 138 passengers getting on and 224 passengers alighting.

See also
 List of railway stations in Taiwan

References

1992 establishments in Taiwan
Railway stations in Pingtung County
Railway stations opened in 1992
Railway stations served by Taiwan Railways Administration